Acmaeops smaragdula is a species of the Lepturinae subfamily in the long-horned beetle family. This beetle is distributed in Belarus, Finland, France, China, Italy, Latvia, Mongolia, Norway, Poland, Russia, Sweden, and Switzerland.

Subtaxa 
There is one variety in species:
 Acmaeops smaragdula var. morio (Fabricius, 1792)

References

Lepturinae
Beetles described in 1793